Jane Sandall  is professor of social science and women's health at the Women's Health Academic Centre of King's College London. Sandall leads the Maternal Health Services and Policy Research Group in King's Health Partners Women’s Health Academic Centre and is also a lead for the National Institute for Health Research (NIHR) South London Applied Research Collaboration. She has authored several Cochrane reviews on midwife-led settings and hundreds of peer-reviewed papers. Her contribution to midwifery and women's health was awarded with an CBE. She also received an honorary doctorate in health sciences from the University of Technology Sydney in 2014.

Biography
Sandall is a midwife by training and started her clinical career in Malawi. She then returned to the UK and completed a bachelor's in social science at London South Bank University in 1990, a Masters at Royal Holloway, University of London in 1991 and a PhD in sociology at University of Surrey in 1998. Her research has been funded by the ESRC, MRC, Wellcome Trust, NIHR, and other charitable sources.

Academic work 
Her research examines the use of new technologies into health care, and ways of organising services to bridge gaps in care and improve quality and safety. Research she has conducted or been involved with includes organisational case studies looking at safety of Birthplace in England, and the relationship between maternity workforce staffing and outcomes using secondary data analysis. Her research has been used by the UK government commission on Nursing and Midwifery, House of Commons Health Committee on Inequalities, NHS London, and US, Brazilian and Australian reviews of maternity services.

Sandall is also a member of RCOG Stillbirth Clinical Studies Group and a member of the NIHR Advanced Fellowship Panel and the ESRC Peer Review College. She is associate editor of the journal Midwifery.

Most cited publications
Sandall J, Soltani H, Gates S, Shennan A, Devane D. Midwife‐led continuity models versus other models of care for childbearing women. Cochrane Database of Systematic Reviews. 2016(4). According to Google Scholar, it has been cited 1509 times
Hatem M, Sandall J, Devane D, Soltani H, Gates S. Midwife‐led versus other models of care for childbearing women. Cochrane database of systematic reviews. 2008(4). According to Google Scholar, this article has been cited 763 times  
Gagnon AJ, Sandall J. Individual or group antenatal education for childbirth or parenthood, or both. Cochrane database of systematic reviews. 2007(3). According to Google Scholar, this article has been cited 546 times  
Poston L, Bell R, Croker H, Flynn AC, Godfrey KM, Goff L, Hayes L, Khazaezadeh N, Nelson SM, Oteng-Ntim E, Pasupathy D. Effect of a behavioural intervention in obese pregnant women (the UPBEAT study): a multicentre, randomised controlled trial. The lancet Diabetes & endocrinology. 2015 Oct 1;3(10):767-77. According to Google Scholar, this article has been cited 503 times  
Sandall J, Tribe RM, Avery L, Mola G, Visser GH, Homer CS, Gibbons D, Kelly NM, Kennedy HP, Kidanto H, Taylor P. Short-term and long-term effects of caesarean section on the health of women and children. The Lancet. 2018 Oct 13;392(10155):1349-57. According to Google Scholar, this article has been cited 347 times  
Homer CS, Friberg IK, Dias MA, ten Hoope-Bender P, Sandall J, Speciale AM, Bartlett LA. The projected effect of scaling up midwifery. The Lancet. 2014 Sep 20;384(9948):1146-57.According to Google Scholar, this article has been cited 277 times  
Leap N, Sandall J, Buckland S, Huber U. Journey to confidence: women's experiences of pain in labour and relational continuity of care. Journal of Midwifery & Women's Health. 2010 May 1;55(3):234-42. According to Google Scholar, this article has been cited 232 times

References

External links
King College website

Living people
Year of birth missing (living people)
British midwives
NIHR Senior Investigators
Alumni of London South Bank University
Alumni of the University of Surrey
Commanders of the Order of the British Empire